World records in athletics are ratified by World Athletics. Athletics records comprise the best performances in the sports of track and field, road running and racewalking.

Records are kept for all events contested at the Olympic Games and some others. Unofficial records for some other events are kept by track and field statisticians. The only non-metric track distance for which official records are kept is the mile run.

Criteria
The criteria which must be satisfied for ratification of a world record are defined by World Athletics in Part III of the Competition Rules. These criteria also apply to national or other restricted records and also to performances submitted as qualifying marks for eligibility to compete in major events such as the Olympic Games.

The criteria include:
 The dimensions of the track and equipment used must conform to standards. In road events, the course must be accurately measured, by a certified measurer.
 Except in road events (road running and race walking), the performance must be set in a single-sex race, with the sole exception of the mixed-sex 4 × 400 m relay, introduced by World Athletics in 2017.
 All team members in a relay race must be of the same nationality.
 Pacemakers are allowed, provided they have not been lapped; lapped athletes must give way.
 Drug testing immediately after the performance is now required for ratification of a record. Existing records which predate this requirement are still extant. Athletes who pass the immediate test but are later found to have been using banned substances have their performances invalidated.
 In running events up to 200 m in distance and in horizontal jump events, wind assistance is permitted only up to 2.0 m/s. In decathlon or heptathlon, average wind assistance of less than 2.0 m/s is required across all applicable disciplines; and maximum of 4.0 m/s in any one event. As an exception, according to rule 36.2, specific event organizers may choose to ignore wind velocity readings exclusively for their specific event records (e.g. a performance in a 100 m race at a meeting with a wind reading of +2.4 m/s may be considered that specific meeting record, but will not be considered as a world record).
 In running events up to 800 m in distance, photo finish fully automatic timing is required.
 There is no restriction on altitude; since the thinner atmosphere of higher altitude provides less air resistance, locations such as Mexico City and Sestriere have previously been the sites of records in the sprint and jump events. See effects of high altitude on humans. Records set at high altitude venues are often marked with an "A" though that does not disqualify it as a record. Under those circumstances, a "sea level" best is also tracked by statisticians. Long-distance races run at altitude, with less oxygen available to the athlete, have been shown to be to the athlete's disadvantage.
 In road events, the course is not required to be a circuit, but the overall decrease in elevation between the start and finish shall not exceed 1:1000, i.e. 1 m/km.
 In road events, the start and finish points of a course, measured along a theoretical straight line between them, shall not be further apart than 50% of the race distance.

Bonus payments
Witnessing a world record brings great pleasure for athletics fans, and athletes' personal sponsors and promoters of major meetings such as the Diamond League and its predecessor, the IAAF Golden League have offered bonuses to athletes breaking a record.

Some middle-distance runners have specialized in acting as pacemakers in longer races, receiving a fee without even finishing the race, and possibly a bonus if a record results. This is a useful occupation for athletes who are capable of running accurately to a specified pace, but not capable of the fastest times to become champions in their own right.

In the pole vault record bonuses create an incentive for an athlete capable of smashing a record to instead break it by the minimum amount (one centimetre), multiple times, at multiple meetings, in order to accumulate multiple bonuses. This has been done by Sergey Bubka in the men's pole vault, and Yelena Isinbayeva in the women's pole vault. Some commentators have complained that neither athlete ever posted as high a mark as they were capable of. In most other disciplines, this issue does not arise, since it is practically impossible to deliberately break a record by a small margin.

World records
World Athletics (then IAAF) commenced the recognition of world records in 1912, and indoor world records after 1987. In 2000, IAAF rule 260.18a (formerly 260.6a) was amended, so that "world records" (as opposed to "indoor world records") can be set in a facility "with or without roof." This rule was not applied retroactively, and has, thus far, only affected the men's and women's pole vault, women's 2,000 m and women's triple jump. The women's vault record has been advanced 9 times indoors by three different women, each ratified as a world record. The last record to be set indoors was in 2004. Sergey Bubka's 1993 pole vault world indoor record of 6.15 m was not considered to be a world record, because it was set before the new rule came into effect. Bubka's world record of 6.14 m, set outdoors in 1994, has been surpassed by five consecutive records set indoors, most recently by Armand Duplantis in 2023 with a 6.22 m (pending) mark. In 2020, Duplantis surpassed Bubka's outdoor world best (the old 6.14 m record), with a 6.15 m vault.

A new IAAF-sanctioned event, the women's 50,000 m walk, does not yet have any recognised world record.

Key to tables 

h = hand timing

+ = en route to a longer distance

A = affected by altitude

OT = oversized track

X = annulled due to doping violations

# = not officially ratified by World Athletics

a = aided road course according to IAAF rule 260.28

est = estimate

i = set indoors (overall world record tables only)

Men

Women

Mixed

Indoor world records

Men

Women

Best performances in non-WA World Record events
Events which do not qualify for World Athletics-ratified world records are typically referred to as world bests.

While races over imperial measured distances were very common in the first half of the 20th century, only the mile remains common today due to its historical prominence in track and field: all other imperial measured distance races became increasingly rare, and the IAAF deleted these events from the world record books in 1976.

In November 2019, World Athletics (WA; formerly IAAF) also deleted several long-distance events (track distances of 20,000 metres, 25,000 metres and 30,000 metres and road distances of 15 km, 20 km, 25 km and 30 km) from the world record books.

Some road racing distances and indoor variations of outdoor events fall outside of WA's lists, and records set in uncommon events usually do not adhere to the strict criteria found in WA-ratifiable events: one example is the 150 metres record, which was set by Usain Bolt on a specially-made straight track, while previous performances (such as the Bailey–Johnson 150-metre race) were completed on a traditional circuit which included a partial bend in the track.

The 40-yard dash, a standard acceleration evaluation for American football players, does not fall within the usual criteria of athletics racing events. In most 40-yard dashes, reaction times are not recorded as timing starts only once the player is in motion, and the standards for timing a "football 40" are so lax and inconsistent that a real world record cannot be claimed.

Performances are also hand-timed and calculated to 1/100th of a second, although studies have shown human beings simply cannot react consistently or accurately enough for this to be a valid method, and even those using light beams are timed by the motion of the athlete, removing the normal factor of reaction time; further, football 40-yard dashes are usually run on a turf surface as opposed to an all weather track. All of these factors make track and "football 40" performances essentially impossible to compare.

The world best time for a "football 40" is 4.17 by Deion Sanders, while the extrapolated best for an Olympic-level athlete (including reacting to a starting gun) is 4.24 by Maurice Greene at the 2001 World Championships in Athletics. Under conventional football timing on a turf field in 2017, Christian Coleman reportedly ran a 4.12.

Outdoor events

Men

Women

Indoor events

Men

Women

Running records by race distance

Notes

Javelin specifications

The men's javelin specification was changed with effect from 1986, and the women's from 2000. The purpose was to reduce the number of illegal flat landings, but a side-effect was to reduce the distance travelled. The prior world records in individual men's and women's javelin were invalidated, but the prior records in decathlon and heptathlon were not.

The old specification records for men's and women's javelin were as follows:

The current decathlon world record was set with the current javelin specification. The best performance in heptathlon using the new specification javelin is:

Other Notes

See also

List of Olympic records in athletics
Ultramarathon records

References

External links
Records overview – IAAF
World Record progression in athletics – athletix.org
Track and Field all-time performances
Masters Track & Field World Records

 
World
Athletics